Dr. Marie Charlotte Brockmann-Jerosch (b. 24 April 1877, Lisbon, d. 14 November 1952, Zürich), was a Swiss botanist noted for her influential research on alpine flora and phylogeography.  She received her Ph.D. from the University of Zurich in 1905. She was married to Heinrich Brockmann-Jerosch, and in 1913 they both joined the second International Phytogeographic Excursion, a two-month tour of by international scientists of North American biogeography, exploring New York, Illinois, Michigan, Nebraska, and Colorado.

Works

References 

 1877 births
 1952 deaths
19th-century Swiss botanists
19th-century women scientists
20th-century Swiss botanists
20th-century women scientists
University of Zurich alumni
Swiss expatriates in Portugal